Lipnitsa is a rural locality (a khutor) in Platavsky Selsoviet Rural Settlement, Konyshyovsky District, Kursk Oblast, Russia. Population:

Geography 
The khutor is located on the Platavka River (a left tributary of the Svapa River), 38.5 km from the Russia–Ukraine border, 82 km west of Kursk, 21 km south-west of the district center – the urban-type settlement Konyshyovka, 9 km from the selsoviet center – Kashara.

 Climate
Lipnitsa has a warm-summer humid continental climate (Dfb in the Köppen climate classification).

Transport 
Lipnitsa is located 38.5 km from the federal route  Ukraine Highway, 66 km from the route  Crimea Highway, 33.5 km from the route  (Trosna – M3 highway), 33 km from the road of regional importance  (Fatezh – Dmitriyev), 21 km from the road  (Konyshyovka – Zhigayevo – 38K-038), 18 km from the road  (Kursk – Lgov – Rylsk – border with Ukraine), 16 km from the road  (Lgov – Konyshyovka), 3.5 km from the road of intermunicipal significance  (Korobkino – summer camp), 18 km from the nearest railway halt Maritsa (railway line Navlya – Lgov-Kiyevsky).

The rural locality is situated 89 km from Kursk Vostochny Airport, 167 km from Belgorod International Airport and 292 km from Voronezh Peter the Great Airport.

References

Notes

Sources

Rural localities in Konyshyovsky District